Mawathagama is a town in the Kurunegala District, North Western Province of Sri Lanka.

References

Populated places in Kurunegala District
Populated places in North Western Province, Sri Lanka